The Hansa-Brandenburg C.I, also known as Type LDD, was a 2-seater armed single-engine reconnaissance biplane designed by Ernst Heinkel, who worked at that time for the parent company in Germany. The C.I had similarities with the earlier B.I (Type FD, also designed by Heinkel), including inward-sloping interplane bracing struts. Like other early-war Austro-Hungarian reconnaissance aircraft, such as C-types of Lloyd or Lohner, the Type LDD had a communal cockpit for its crew.

The C.I served in the Imperial and Royal Aviation Troops in visual- and photographic reconnaissance, artillery observation and light bombing duties from early spring 1916 to the end of World War I. The aircraft had good handling characteristics, and steady introduction of more powerful engines in successive production batches (see below) enabled the improvement of performance and thus the continuing front-line service.

Armament of the type consisted of a free-firing  Schwarzlose machine gun at the rear for the observer, and at least in some aircraft for the pilot there was also a similar fixed, non-synchronised forward-firing gun in a pod above the top wing. This latter weapon was replaced in later production examples by a synchronised  Schwarzlose gun on the port side of the fuselage.

Production

Data from Austro-Hungarian Army Aircraft of World War One
In addition to 84 aircraft built by Hansa-Brandenburg, Phönix Flugzeugwerke (400 C.I(Ph)), Ungarische Flugzeugfabrik A.G. (834 C.I(U)) and Aero (A-14, A-15, A-26) also made the type under licence in the following batches:

Phönix(Brandenburg C.I(Ph)) 
Series 23 and 26 with  Austro-Daimler
Series 27 with  Austro-Daimler
Series 29 with  Austro-Daimler
Series 29.5, 129, 229 and 329 with  Hiero 6
Series 429 with  Hiero 6

Ufag(Brandenburg C.I(U)) 
Series 61, 64, 67 and 68 with  Austro-Daimler
Series 63 with  Mercedes D.III
Series 269 with  Austro-Daimler
Series 69 with  Hiero
Series 169 with  Benz Bz.IVa
Series 369 with  Hiero

Aero (Czechoslovakia) post-war
Aero A.14, Aero A.15 and Aero A.26 with Walter-built 138 kW (185 hp) BMW IIIa

Poland (post war)
In 1919-1920, fifteen aircraft, differing in construction and engines, were assembled by the Poles in Lviv RPL-III workshops, and then in 1920-1924 some fifteen were made in Kraków workshops (known locally as Brandenburg K).

Arsenalul Aeronautic (Romania) post-war

In the 1920s with the increase in need of training aircraft, the Romanian Ministry of War approved the construction of Hansa-Brandenburg C.I airplanes at Arsenalul Aeronautic from Cotroceni. The aircraft were powered by the Austro-Daimler 160 hp engine. It was the first large-scale aircraft production that took place in Romania. Between 1922 and 1923, a total of 120 Hansa-Brandenburg C.I were manufactured.

Operational history
After World War I, in 1918, 22 original Hansa-Brandenburg C.I seized by the Poles were among the first aircraft of Polish Air Force. According to some publications, it was the first Polish aircraft to perform a combat flight on 5 November 1918, flown by Stefan Bastyr (others claim he flew Oeffag C.II). They were used in Battle of Lemberg and then Polish–Ukrainian War and Polish–Soviet War. Approximately 30 more aircraft were assembled or built by the Poles afterwards in Lviv and Kraków.

During the Hungarian–Romanian War, Romania used Hansa-Brandenburg C.I airplanes captured from the Hungarian Red Air Arm. By the end of the war, a total of 22 aircraft of this type were captured. The aircraft were used by the Romanian Air Force until the mid 1930s.

Operators

Austro-Hungarian Imperial and Royal Aviation Troops

Polish Air Force (inter-war)

 Czechoslovakian Air Force (inter-war)

Royal Yugoslav Air Force - Postwar

Romanian Air Force - Postwar
Hungarian Soviet Republic
Hungarian Red Air Arm - Postwar

Surviving aircraft and replicas

 Airworthy Hansa Brandenburg C.I replica in Austria

Specifications (Brandenburg C.I(Ph) Series 23)

See also

References

Bibliography
 Munson, Kenneth - Bombers, Patrol and Reconnaissance Aircraft 1914 - 1919

External links

 A page about Hansa-Brandenburg C.I in Polish Air Force service (in Polish).

C.I
1910s Austro-Hungarian military reconnaissance aircraft
Military aircraft of World War I
Biplanes
Single-engined tractor aircraft
Aircraft first flown in 1916